A fig tree is any of about 850 species of woody trees in the genus Ficus.

Fig Tree or Figtree may also refer to:

Tree species
 Common fig (Ficus carica), a tree cultivated for its edible fruit
 Curtain fig (Ficus microcarpa), also known as Chinese Banyan, Malayan Banyan, Taiwan Banyan, Indian Laurel
 Moreton Bay fig (Ficus macrophylla), a tree with buttress roots that can reach  in height
 Rusty fig (Ficus rubiginosa), also known as Port Jackson fig or little-leaf fig
 Weeping fig (Ficus benjamina), also known as Benjamin's fig, and often sold in stores as just ficus

Places
 Figtree, New South Wales, an inner western suburb of Wollongong, New South Wales, Australia
 Figtree, Saint Kitts and Nevis, a town on the island of Nevis
 Figtree, Zimbabwe, a village in the province of Matabeleland South
 Fig Tree Pocket, Queensland, a suburb of Brisbane, Australia

As surname 

 Gemma Figtree, Australian interventional cardiologist

Other uses
 Fig Tree (film), a 2018 Israeli film
 Fig Tree Bridge, a girder bridge that spans the Lane Cove River in Sydney, Australia
 Fig Tree, an imprint of Penguin Books

See also
 
 Fig (disambiguation)
 Figs in the Bible, references to figs and fig trees in the Tanakh and the New Testament
 Curtain Fig Tree, a heritage-listed tree in Queensland, Australia
 Moreton Bay Fig Tree (Santa Barbara, California), the largest Ficus macrophylla in the United States